Adderley is a village in England.

Adderley may also refer to:

Adderley (surname)
Adderley Head, a headland on Banks Peninsula
Adderley Street, road in Cape Town, South Africa
Adderley Park, park in Birmingham, England
Adderley Green, village in Staffordshire, England

See also
Adderly (television programme)